The Great Unknown (German:Die große Unbekannte) is a 1924 German silent drama film directed by Willi Wolff and starring Lydia Potechina, Ellen Richter and Leopold von Ledebur.

The film's sets were designed by the art director Hans Dreier.

Cast
 Georg Baselt 
 Harry Hardt 
 Leopold von Ledebur 
 Rudolf Lettinger 
 Hans Wassmann 
 Charles Puffy
 Lydia Potechina
 Georg Alexander 
 Hans Junkermann 
 Ellen Richter

References

Bibliography
 Grange, William. Cultural Chronicle of the Weimar Republic. Scarecrow Press, 2008.

External links

1924 films
Films of the Weimar Republic
Films directed by Willi Wolff
German silent feature films
UFA GmbH films
German black-and-white films
German drama films
1924 drama films
Silent drama films
1920s German films
1920s German-language films